Alan Greene (August 29, 1911 – March 12, 2001) was an American diver who competed in the 1936 Summer Olympics. In 1936 he won the bronze medal in the 3 meter springboard event.

References

1911 births
2001 deaths
Divers at the 1936 Summer Olympics
Olympic bronze medalists for the United States in diving
American male divers
Medalists at the 1936 Summer Olympics
20th-century American people
21st-century American people